Sampath Bank PLC is a licensed commercial bank incorporated in Sri Lanka in 1987 with 229 branches and 373 ATMs island-wide. It has won the "Bank of the Year" award by "The Banker" of Financial Times Limited – London, for the second consecutive year and the "National Business Excellence Awards 2010".
It has become the third largest private sector bank in Sri Lanka with Rs. 453 billion in deposits as of 30 June 2016.

History
The bank was originally incorporated as Investment and Credit Bank Limited in 1988. The bank became popularly known as Sampath. In 1988, Sampath Bank started to operate a multi-point network of automated teller machines (ATMs) for the first time in the country, as "Sampath Electronic Teller" or "SET". Then, with the popularity of ATM banking introduced MasterCard (in 1989), PBU (Personal Banking Unit) and Uni-Banking System. The bank was the first to introduce debit cards in South Asia in 1997 and was the first in Sri Lanka to issue a debit card instantly at the time of opening an account. The first-ever Cheque Imaging & Truncating (CIT) site in Sri Lanka was launched by Sampath Bank in 2004. Since 2009, the bank is the third-largest private sector bank in Sri Lanka in terms of total assets.

Growth
The first office of Sampath bank was located at Wijewardhana Mawatha, Colombo 10 and later in 1998, was moved their Headquarters to Sir James Peiris Mawatha, Colombo 02, Sri Lanka. At the end of the first year, the staff had 94 members.

The first ATM operated by the bank was installed in 1986 and at the year-end of 2007 it crossed the 150 mark and now the bank is operating over 220 ATMs islandwide.

In 1996, the bank introduced the "Tele-banking" facility. This led to the re-engineering of its IT-induced banking technology in 1998 and the "SampathNet" – Internet Banking facility launched in July 2000. "Slipless Banking" is the latest innovation of the bank, where no paperwork is required in most over-the-counter transactions. This is another first in Sri Lanka, introduced by Sampath Bank.

Now the bank operates with a total of 229 branches including 12 super branches and 360 ATMs including 8 off-site ATMs.

Technology
Sampath Bank was the first bank in Sri Lanka to operate with a fully computerized database and technologies since its birth in 1986.

Sampath bank was the first to introduce automated teller machines to Sri Lanka branded as "SET", MasterCard, Personal Banking Unit Facility, Uni Banking System & Debit Cards (Initially with Cirrus and Maestro and Visa).  
After the massive re-engineering work done by the bank for its IT-induced banking technology, the bank was able to launch Internet Banking, Internet Payment Gateways and mobile banking services which are online 24x7.

The Bank become the first in Sri Lanka to introduce one-day clearing for all cheques drawn on any Sampath Bank branch, collected by any commercial bank on the island and presented through Sri Lanka Automated Clearing House (SLACH). The first-ever Cheque Imagine & Truncating (CIT) site in Sri Lanka was launched by the bank in October 2004.

Sampath Bank won a Gold and Merit Award at the National Best Quality Software Awards 2008 for the in-house category for developing the "Credit Approval System" (CAS) and "Electronic Money Transfer" (EMTS) applications. It was also honoured at the National Science and Technology Awards 2008 for the category of "Local Developed New Technologies" which have resulted in a successfully Marketed Product/Service for the product "Sampath eRemittance System".

Web card

This is supposed to work as a credit card, but with prior deposits, which makes it almost a debit card again which you can get a few offers. However, most of the websites won't allow you to pay even if you have enough money in the Web Card even if you have 2 step verification.

See also
 List of banks in Sri Lanka

References

External links
 Sampath Bank Official Web Site
 Lanka Business Online
 Sampath Bank Expansion : Report by Lanka Business Report
 The Banker: Report

Banks of Sri Lanka
Banks established in 1986
Companies listed on the Colombo Stock Exchange
Sri Lankan companies established in 1986